Muryeong of Baekje (462–523, r. 501–23) was the 25th king of Baekje, one of the Three Kingdoms of Korea.  During his reign, Baekje remained allied with Silla against Goguryeo, and expanded its relationships with China and Japan.

Background
The Tomb of King Muryeong calls him King Sama (斯摩), and records his birth year as 462.

The Samguk Sagi calls him King Muryeong, with the personal name (휘) of Sama (斯摩).  He is described as the second son of the 24th king Dongseong. He became king when Dongseong was assassinated by the court official Baekga. The following year, he crushed a planned rebellion by Baekga.

Other records
China's Liang shu gives his surname as Yeo and personal name as Yung, and states that he restored Baekje into a strong nation.

Japan's Nihonshoki gives his birth year as 461, and describes him as the son of the 21st king Gaero. It is recorded Buyeo Gonji, the brother of King Gaero went to Japan to serve Emperor Yūryaku with King Muryeong's mother, and she went into labor as their ship was passing by a small Japanese island. He was called Semakishi (嶋君) and King Shima (斯麻王) in Japanese records because he was born in an island.

Reign

In 501, he sent an army to attack Goguryeo's Sugok-seong. In 503, he repelled an attack by the Mohe. In 507, he successfully countered another attack by Goguryeo and Mohe forces. In 512, Goguryeo conquered two castles, but Muryeong personally led 3,000 men to destroy the Goguryeo army. In 523, he ordered the building of a fortified wall to defend the northern border.

According to both historical and archeological sources, contact and trade between China and Baekje increased during Muryeong's reign. In 512, according to the Liang shu, Muryeong sent Baekje's first mission to the newly established court of the Chinese Liang Dynasty. A second mission was sent in 521, announcing various victories over Goguryeo. In reply, the Liang emperor bestowed various titles on him, including "Great General Tranquilizing the East (寧東大將軍)" and "King of Baekje".  These titles were also found engraved on a tablet in King Muryeong's tomb.

In 503, he sent a bronze mirror, and in 513 and 516, Confucian scholars to Japan.

Legacy
In 1971, King Muryeong's tomb was excavated in Songsan-ri, Gongju, South Korea, where he was buried with his queen.

In 2001, Japan's emperor Akihito told reporters "I, on my part, feel a certain kinship with Korea, given that it is recorded in the Chronicles of Japan that the mother of Emperor Kanmu was one of the descendant of King Muryong of Baekje." It was the first time that a Japanese emperor publicly referred a Korean blood in the imperial line. According to the Shoku Nihongi, Emperor Kanmu's mother, Takano no Niigasa (720 - 790) is a descendant of Prince Junda, son of Muryeong, who died in Japan in 513 (Nihon Shoki Chapter 17).

Family
 Father: Dongseong of Baekje
 Mother: unknown
Unnamed Queen
 1st son: 26th King, Seong of Baekje (聖王, ?–554) – before he was king he was known as Buyeo Myeong (扶餘明) or Buyeo Myeongnong (扶餘明禯).
 2nd son: Prince Junda (淳陀太子, ?–513) – known in Baekje as "Buyeo Junta", settled in Japan and became ancestor of the Yamato clan.
 3rd son: Shigakishi (斯我君, ?–?) – known in Baekje as Buyeo Sa'a. He was sent to Japan in 505 as a political hostage to Emperor Buretsu of Japan.

Popular culture
 Portrayed by Lee Jae-ryong in the 2013 MBC TV series The King's Daughter, Soo Baek-hyang.

See also
 List of monarchs of Korea
 History of Korea
 Tomb of King Muryeong

References
  Content in this article was copied from Samguk Sagi Scroll 23 at the Shoki Wiki, which is licensed under the Creative Commons Attribution-Share Alike 3.0 (Unported) (CC-BY-SA 3.0) license.

Further reading
 Kim, Won-Yong. “The Tomb of King Muryong of the Paekche Dynasty.” Asian Pacific Quarterly of Cultural and Social Affairs (Seoul) 3:3 (Winter 1971): 34-46.
 Paik, Seung-gil. "Excavation of the Tomb of Paekche King Muryong." Korea Journal 11:8 (August 1971): 48-51.

External links
 Article on King Muryong's Ascension to the Throne
  Yamato (和) and Takano (高野) clans : the descendant of prince Junda, son of Muryeong

462 births
523 deaths
Baekje rulers
Baekje Buddhists
Korean Buddhist monarchs
6th-century monarchs in Asia
5th-century Korean people
6th-century Korean people